Dormitator latifrons, the Pacific fat sleeper, is a species of fish in the family Eleotridae found on the Pacific coast of the Americas from around Palos Verdes, California, to Peru, where it can be found in stagnant or sluggish fresh or brackish waters or nearby marine waters. Most do not exceed . A maximum weight of  has been recorded. This species is important to local commercial fisheries and is actively farmed.

References

External links
 Photograph

latifrons
Fish of the Gulf of California
Fish of Mexican Pacific coast
Western Central American coastal fauna
Fish described in 1844
Taxa named by John Richardson (naturalist)